The Dickinson-Moore House is a historic house at 707 Robert S. Moore Avenue in Arkansas City, Arkansas. This -story Craftsman style house was built c. 1915, probably for a member of the locally prominent Dickinson family, one of its early occupants. (Despite this precaution, the house was under eight feet of water in a major 1927 flood.) The house has retained its original siding and windows, and exhibits typical Craftsman details such as exposed rafter ends and large knee brackets in the eaves.

The house was listed on the National Register of Historic Places in 2011.

See also
National Register of Historic Places listings in Desha County, Arkansas

References

Houses on the National Register of Historic Places in Arkansas
Houses in Desha County, Arkansas
Houses completed in 1915
American Craftsman architecture in Arkansas
National Register of Historic Places in Desha County, Arkansas